Long Yuan Miguel Gutiérrez Feng (born February 23, 1995) is a Mexican-American swimmer. He competed for Mexico in the men's 100 metre butterfly event at the 2016 Summer Olympics; his time of 53.34 seconds in the heats did not qualify him for the semifinals.

Gutiérrez was born in Mexico and immigrated to Salt Lake City with his family when he was three years old. He competed for the California Golden Bears at the collegiate level. He was a member of Brighton High School swim team, and currently still holds the 5A state records in the 50-yard freestyle, 100-yard freestyle, 200-yard freestyle, and the 100-yard butterfly.

Long holds the Mexican national record in the men's 100 butterfly with a lifetime best time of 52.22. He was also a member of the Mexican Olympic team in Rio 2016.

References

External links

1995 births
Living people
Sportspeople from Salt Lake City
Mexican male swimmers
Mexican sportspeople of Chinese descent
American sportspeople of Chinese descent
American people of Hong Kong descent
Sportspeople of Chinese descent
American male swimmers
Olympic swimmers of Mexico
Swimmers at the 2016 Summer Olympics
Swimmers at the 2019 Pan American Games
California Golden Bears men's swimmers
American sportspeople of Mexican descent
Pan American Games medalists in swimming
Pan American Games bronze medalists for Mexico
Swimmers at the 2015 Pan American Games
Central American and Caribbean Games medalists in swimming
Central American and Caribbean Games gold medalists for Mexico
Competitors at the 2018 Central American and Caribbean Games
Medalists at the 2019 Pan American Games